Events from the year 2013 in the Czech Republic.

Incumbents
President: Václav Klaus (until 7 March). Miloš Zeman (starting 8 March)
Prime Minister: Petr Nečas (until 10 July), Jiří Rusnok (starting 10 July)

Events

January 26 - Czech presidential election, 2013
April 29 - A powerful explosion badly damaged an office building in the center of Prague, injuring up to 43 people.
June 17 - prime minister Petr Nečas submits his resignation after a corruption scandal.
November 21 - A Prague nursing school issues a hijab ban, coursing some controversy.

Sports
April 24–28: Ellen van Dijk wins 2013 Gracia-Orlová

Births

Deaths

2 January – Karel Čáslavský, film historian and television host (born 1937)
3 January – Ivan Mackerle, cryptozoologist (born 1942)
7 January – Jiřina Jirásková, actress (born 1931)
10 January – Michael Hofbauer, actor (born 1964)
18 January – Martin Barbarič, football player (born 1970)
24 January – Miroslav Janů, football player (born 1959)
28 January – 
Oldřich Kulhánek, painter (born 1940)
Ladislav Pavlovič, Czechoslovak football player (born 1926)
24 January – Jan Lužný, gardener (born 1926)
1 February – Rudolf Dašek, guitarist (born 1933)
3 February – Edgar Knobloch, writer (born 1927)
14 February – Zdeněk Zikán, football player (born 1937)
2 March – Zdeněk Švestka, astronomer (born 1925)
9 March – Luboš Měkota, entrepreneur (born 1957)
17 March – Rudolf Battěk, politician (born 1924)
22 March – Vladimír Čech, actor (born 1951)
23 March – Miroslav Štěpán, politician (born 1945)
24 March – Čestmír Císař, politician (born 1920)
4 May – Oldřich Velen, actor (born 1921)
15 May – Thomas M. Messer, director of The Guggenheim (born 1920)
16 May – Valtr Komárek, economist (born 1930)
20 May – Miloslav Kříž, basketball player (born 1924)
9 June – Zdeněk Rotrekl, poet (born 1920)
19 June – Filip Topol, singer (born 1965)
27 July – Josef Geryk, football player (born 1942)
8 August – Jiří Krejčík, film director and actor (born 1918)
22 August – Petr Kment, wrestler, Olympic bronze medalist (born 1942)
7 September – Ilja Hurník, composer (born 2013)
10 September – Josef Němec, boxer (born 1933)
2 October – Zdeněk Rytíř, singer (born 1933)
5 October – Erich Cviertna, football player and manager (born 1951)
28 October – Ferdinand Havlík, composer (born 1928)
16 November – Zbyněk Hejda, poet (born 1930)
20 November – Pavel Bobek, singer (born 1937)
25 November – Egon Lánský, politician (born 1934)

References 

 
2010s in the Czech Republic
Years of the 21st century in the Czech Republic
Czech Republic
Czech Republic